Buccal fat pad extraction or buccal fat removal is a plastic surgery procedure that removes a grape-size piece buccal fat-pad tissue from each side of the face in order to reduce the appearance of cheek puffiness. It is a strictly cosmetic surgery.

History 
The buccal fat pad was firstly described by Heister as a glandular tissue in 1732. However, in 1802 Xavier Bichat popularized and defined the structure as fat tissue. The procedure is also known as cheek fat reduction, buccal fat removal, or bichetomia in Spanish. The American Society of Plastic Surgery does not keep statistics on the procedure.

On December 16, 2022, The New York Times reported that the procedure was gaining popularity on Twitter and TikTok. It is widely suspected that celebrities like Bella Hadid, Lea Michele have had the procedure to obtain high, contoured, and chiseled cheekbones. In 2021, Chrissy Teigen revealed that she had undergone the procedure.

Surgical procedure

Cost 
Buccal fat removal is considered a cosmetic procedure and is rarely covered by insurance. It is typically performed by plastic surgeons. According to RealSelf, the average cost was $2,400 in 2019. Interviewed by The New York Times in 2022, one plastic surgeon stated he charged $40,000 for the procedure, while other surgeons said they typically charged between $7,000 and $16,000.

Associated procedures 
Buccal fat removal is often performed as a solo procedure but can be done alongside a facelift, chin implant, neck lift or any surgery attempting to add definition to the face. It is often also done in combination with chin liposuction and fat grafting.

Technique 
The reduction of buccal fat pad is usually performed under local anesthesia with the patient completely awake. The typical approach for removing the buccal fat pad is through an incision in the mouth, towards the back of the oral cavity, near the second upper molar. The buccinator muscle is then encountered and without making an incision, the fibers are separated until the buccal fat is seen. Once the buccal fat is visualized, a thin casing over the fat is opened and the fat is gently teased out while gentle pressure is applied externally. The fat is then cauterized at the base and removed. The remainder of the buccal fat pad then is replaced to its anatomic site and the oral mucosa is sutured close, and the two incisions are sutured. Typically the procedure takes about 30 minutes to complete.

Recovery 
Patients typically have swelling for a few days, but often this swelling is not visible externally. Typically, self absorbing sutures that dissolve on their own are used. The final results can take up to 3 months to manifest.

Risks 
Injury to the buccal branch of the facial nerve is a risk; the buccal branch nerves that might be affected control facial functions, therefore, such damage might result in partial facial paralysis, regional facial numbness, loss of taste, et cetera. Likewise, damage to the parotid duct also might occur in men and women whose parotid ducts run deep to the buccal fat pad, which can lead to a salivary fistula or buildup of saliva.

In popular culture 
The surgery becomes trend in 2020s and people colloquially named it "Handsome Squidward surgery"

References 

Plastic surgery